Lithothamnion glaciale is the botanical name for a species of multicellular red algae of the genus Lithothamnion, subfamily Melobesioideae.

Description
Lithothamnion glaciale grows as an encrusting, chalky thallus, deep reddish in colour and up to 20cm in diameter and 4mm thick. It develops simple cylindrical branches growing to 15mm long and 4mm in diameter.

Reproduction                                                                                                                                                            
These algae are dioecious, with domed spermatangial conceptacles, carpogonial conceptacles and carposporangial conceptacles.

Habitat
Epilithic on rock in low-littoral pools and in the sublittoral to 34m.

References

Corallinaceae